Hakea prostrata, commonly known as harsh hakea, is a species of shrub that is endemic to  the south-west of Western Australia. It is a low-lying shrub with prickly leaves and groups of white or cream-coloured flowers in late winter and early spring.

Description
The oblong-obovate stem-clasping leaves have prickly edges and a central vein. Plentiful sweetly scented white or cream flowers are produced in axillary racemose inflorescences between July and October in its native range.

Taxonomy and naming 
Hakea prostrata was first formally described in 1810 by botanist Robert Brown and published the description in Transactions of the Linnean Society of London. The specific epithet (prostrata) is a Latin word meaning "down flat", "overthrown" or "laid low", referring to the low growing, coastal form of this plant.

Distribution and habitat
Harsh hakea is found from Geraldton to Esperance. It grows on hillsides, in shallow soil on granite outcrops and an stabilised sand dunes.

Conservation status
Hakea prostrata is classified as "not threatened" by the Western Australian Government.

References

prostrata
Eudicots of Western Australia
Plants described in 1810
Taxa named by Robert Brown (botanist, born 1773)